Route 116 is a  Canadian secondary highway in southeastern New Brunswick.

Communities along Route 116
Fowlers Corner
Briggs Corner
Gaspereau Forks
Castaway
Mortimer
Harcourt
Bryants Corner
Smiths Corner
Bass River
Molus River
Rexton (Bonar Law Avenue)

See also
List of New Brunswick provincial highways

References

New Brunswick provincial highways
Roads in Queens County, New Brunswick
Roads in Kent County, New Brunswick